Nate Kinsella (born March 19, 1980) is an American musician who currently resides in Brooklyn, New York.     Nate's musical resumé is vast, including most notably projects such as American Football, Joan of Arc, Make Believe, Mata Hari and Decembers Architects. Nate  assisted Mike Kinsella, his cousin, in the creation of Owen's I Do Perceive album.  In 2007, Nate released his debut album for his solo project, Birthmark, called The Layer in October 2007. Nate released his second record under the Birthmark moniker, Shaking Hands, on 30 November 2010. On 15 May 2012 Nate released his third full-length album Antibodies. Since 2014, Kinsella has played bass with American Football, fronted by his cousin Mike, recording two studio albums with them in 2016 and 2019 respectively. How You Look When You’re Falling Down, Birthmark's fourth full-length album was released by Nate on 16 October 2015.

References

1980 births
Living people
Musicians from Illinois